Sailor King may refer to several European monarchs:
 Frederick IX of Denmark (1899–1972), King of Denmark
 George V (1865–1936), King of the United Kingdom
 George VI (1895–1952), King of the United Kingdom
 Harald V of Norway (born 1937), King of Norway
 William IV of the United Kingdom (1765–1837), King of the United Kingdom
 Sailor King: The Life of King William IV by Tom Pocock

Other uses
 Sailor King, an American Thoroughbred and winner of the Spindrift Stakes (1898)
 Sailor King, a Japanese voice actor starring in Nerima Daikon Brothers
 Sailor King, a drifter that struck a mine and sank in the North Sea in November 1940
 Sailor King Moondog White, an independent candidate for the Canadian Extreme Wrestling Party
 HMT Sailor King, a requisitioned trawler of the Royal Navy for use in World War II

See also
 List of monarchs by nickname